Keystone Agricultural Producers (KAP) is Manitoba’s largest general farm policy organization, with over 4,000 members that include farmers and farm commodity groups. KAP is one of the province's most active lobby groups and is a member organization of the Canadian Federation of Agriculture.

KAP was formed in 1984 to replace the former Manitoba Farm Bureau, and is headquartered in Winnipeg, Manitoba/

Activities 
The organization lobbies government and industry on issues that affect Manitoba farmers. For example, KAP was part of the effort to develop legislative sanctions for Canadian railways that failed to transport minimum grain volumes for farmers in 2013. As a result, the Canadian National Railway and Canadian Pacific Railway were fined a combined $150,000, and the federal government brought in the Fair Rail for Grain Farmers Act in 2014, which required railways to move a minimum amount of grain per week.

KAP uses the news media bring attention to issues facing producers. During heavy flooding in 2014 when nearly 2 million acres in the province were lost to water damage, KAP was vocal in the media about the need for better crop insurance coverage.

KAP promotes agriculture’s contributions to Manitoba and Canada. Through a 2012 bus board campaign entitled "Sharing the Harvest," KAP advertised the fact that farming, along with the food and beverage-processing and food-service industries, generated over $10 billion per year in Manitoba in 2010.

Organizational structure 
Keystone Agricultural Producers is funded by its members, and governed by an elected executive and board of directors. Presidents are elected from the KAP membership, and may serve up to four one-year terms. The current president of KAP is Bill Campbell, who replaced Dan Mazier in 2018.

KAP policy is developed by members, through resolutions passed at the annual general meeting and at general council meetings held three times per year. Once passed, a resolution becomes organizational policy

References

Agricultural organizations based in Manitoba
1984 establishments in Manitoba
Organizations based in Manitoba
Organizations established in 1984
Advocacy groups in Canada